The Literary Heights Festival is a Polish literary festival founded in 2015 which takes place in the vicinity of Nowa Ruda at the foot of the Owl Mountains in the Kłodzko Valley.

The event's organizers include the Mount Babel Cultural Association, the city and commune of Nowa Ruda, while the hosts are Karol Maliszewski and Olga Tokarczuk. The festival's program includes educational sessions, debates, concerts, panels, shows, meetings, poetry, literary workshops, film screenings, culinary workshops and various exhibitions.

References

External links 
 
 Literacka Nowa Ruda
 Festiwal Góry Literatury 14–17 lipca 2016
 Festiwal Góry Literatury do 9 lipca 2017

Literary festivals in Poland
Nowa Ruda